Eduardo de Mesa Eigenmann (born February 18, 1940), better known by his stage name Eddie Mesa, is a Filipino retired actor and singer. He was discovered by talent agents when he sang a Sammy Davis song. Afterwards he changed his surname to his mother's maiden name as Eddie Mesa, lead singer of Eddie Mesa And The Trippers. He was nicknamed Elvis Presley of the Philippines during his time as an impersonator of Elvis. He has acted in movies with the late Susan Roces and the late Fernando Poe Jr. Today he lives with his wife in the United States, where he has become a pastor who sings for God. He is the father of Michael de Mesa, Mark Gil and Cherie Gil and grandfather of Andi Eigenmann.

Film career
He acted with Eddie Romero's Hollywood film The Raiders of Leyte Gulf (1963). Kaputol ng Isang Awit (1991)

Family
Eddie Mesa was born Eduardo de Mesa Eigenmann in Manila. His father was of Swiss-German ancestry. While on the job, he met his future wife Rosemarie Gil. Gil become pregnant with their first child Michael Edward (Michael de Mesa) who was born in 1960. The couple married in 1961 and had two more children: Raphael John (Mark Gil) and Evangeline Rose (Cherie Gil). They were separated in 1970. In 1978, Mesa left for Guam for six months and then moved to Hawaii when Martial Law was declared in 1972, while Rosemarie remained in the Philippines still active as an actress. Mesa reunited with his wife in 1986 after he became a born-again Christian.

Today, Eddie and Rosemarie have 13 grandchildren, most of whom have followed in their footsteps professionally: Ryan Eigenmann, Geoff Eigenmann, and AJ Eigenmann (Michael's sons), and Gabby Eigenmann, Sid Lucero, Andi Eigenmann, and Max Eigenmann (Mark's children from different women).

Awards

References

External links

1940 births
Living people
20th-century Filipino male singers
Filipino people of Swiss descent
Filipino people of German descent
Eddie
Male actors from Manila
Singers from Manila
People of Swiss-German descent
Filipino male film actors
Converts to evangelical Christianity
Filipino Christians
Filipino evangelicals